The 2011 season for  began in January at the Tour Down Under and ended in October with Robbie McEwen's participation in the Noosa Grand Prix. As a UCI ProTeam, they were automatically invited and obligated to send a squad to every event in the UCI World Tour.

While the team had 28 wins in 2011, and showed well enough to briefly be the leading team in the UCI World Tour rankings, they were nearly invisible in the Grand Tours, the races which have defined manager Johan Bruyneel's managerial career. A Tour de France besieged by crashes and injuries led to Haimar Zubeldia in 15th place being their best finisher, the worst showing for a Bruyneel-led team at the Tour in five years. The team's principal successes were the three major stage races in the United States, the Tour of California, the Tour of Utah, and the USA Pro Cycling Challenge. Team RadioShack fielded the overall winner in all three events, Chris Horner in California and Levi Leipheimer in Utah and Colorado. The team also won seven other stage races, easily the most of any major team on the season.

2011 roster
Ages as of January 1, 2011.

Riders who joined the team for the 2011 season

Riders who left the team during or after the 2010 season

One-day races
Before the spring season and the races known as classics, Team RadioShack was active in the Vuelta a Mallorca series of single-day races. In the Trofeo Inca, Hermans figured into a winning breakaway that formed  from the finish, on the Puig Major climb. When this group's lead stretched to a minute with only , it was clear they would stay away. Hermans stated that he had not felt confident going into the sprint, but he proved fresher than breakaway companions Arkaitz Durán and Xavier Tondó, winning the race. Later in February, Hunter won the field sprint finish to the second day of the Tour de Mumbai, restyled for 2011 as two one-day races in a similar vein to the Vuelta a Mallorca.

Spring classics
Much like the Bruyneel-led Astana teams, Team RadioShack was not a major player in the spring classics. They did, however, attain a notable result in the season's third monument race, Paris–Roubaix. After a breakaway group of ten riders had first gone clear right about the time the cobbled sectors first began, Rast worked his way into a chase group which formed at the Arenberg sector. His group caught up with the leaders, and while 's Johan Vansummeren soloed to victory, Rast stayed with the next group on the road through to the end of the race. He, Fabian Cancellara, and Maarten Tjallingii contested the sprint for second place. Cancellara took second with Tjallingii third, leaving Rast just off the podium in fourth. Thanks to this result and the team's strong showing at the Tour of the Basque Country stage race, they became the number one team in the UCI rankings after Paris–Roubaix.

The team also sent squads to the Trofeo Palma de Mallorca, Trofeo Cala Millor, Trofeo Deià, Trofeo Palmanova, the Classica Sarda, Milan – San Remo, Gent–Wevelgem, the Tour of Flanders, the Brabantse Pijl, La Flèche Wallonne and Liège–Bastogne–Liège, but placed no higher than 12th in any of these races.

Fall races
The team also sent squads to Paris–Brussels, the Grand Prix Cycliste de Montréal, Paris–Bourges and the Giro di Lombardia, but finished no higher than 12th in any of these races.

Stage races
The Tour Down Under, the first stage race of the season, was Armstrong's last professional race. Despite claiming that he was "definitely not flying halfway around the world to sit in the bunch," Armstrong only showed combativity at one moment during the race, during an ultimately unsuccessful breakaway attempt during stage 5 to Willunga. He finished the race in 67th place, 6'42" down on overall winner Cameron Meyer. Elsewhere, McEwen was, for a time, an overall contender in the race. He was third in the sprint finish to the first stage, with the time bonus affording him that same position in the first general classification standings. The next day, a second place left him tied for first overall with Ben Swift and Matthew Goss, and gave him the ochre jersey as race leader. After slipping slightly over the next two days, McEwen lost any chance at overall victory on the Willunga stage, finishing in the same group as Armstrong 1'48" down on stage winner Francisco Ventoso and the majority of the overall contenders. He finished the race in 28th place. At the Ruta del Sol in February, Irizar finished second in the short stage 1 time trial, mere tenths of a second behind stage winner Jimmy Engoulvent. The next stage ended in a 43-rider sprint, and Engoulvent was dropped on the day's first climb, finishing nearly 23 minutes back. As a result, Irizar took the race leadership. The remaining race stages were similar – stage 3 featured an 85-rider sprint, stage 4 a 90-rider sprint, and stage 5 a 33-rider sprint. Irizar finished safely in the bunch on each stage, winning the race overall by a single second over Jurgen Van den Broeck and two over teammate Leipheimer, who had similarly ridden good stage 1 time trials. The squad also won the teams classification.

With a squad made up of younger riders, the team was quite successful at the Three Days of West Flanders stage race. Sergent won the prologue time trial, with Rosseler and Bewley in second and third ten seconds off his pace. Kwiatkowski also clocked in ten seconds off Sergent's time, for fifth on the day. The first of the two road race stages ended in a full field sprint with little change to the overall standings, and the second featured a reduced group sprint. Bewley missed an early selection and finished five minutes back, but Sergent, Rosseler, and Kwiatkowski all finished with the front group. They finished in that order in the final overall classification, giving the team a clean sweep of the event's final podium; Sergent also won the young rider classification and the squad also claimed the teams classification. At Paris–Nice in March, Klöden won the first major mountain stage, stage 5, from a very selective eight-rider group that finished together at the front of the race. He took the overall race leadership with the result, eleven years after he had won Paris–Nice overall. He finished fourth in the individual time trial the next day, but fourth place was a good 46 seconds down on stage winner Tony Martin, as the younger German took the race leadership. Klöden was unable to make back any time in the last two road stages, finishing second overall. The squad also took the team award. At Critérium International in March, Klöden won the stage 3 time trial, but managed only 22nd overall, having lost time in both the mountainous and flat road race stages. At the concurrent Volta a Catalunya, the team experienced both success and hardship. Cardoso won stage 4 in a full field sprint – so full that only two riders failed to finish with the rest of the peloton. Leipheimer had finished well-placed in the race's mountainous third stage, ceding 23 seconds to former teammate Alberto Contador but occupying a podium position, third, with the result. He continued to hold it through the sixth stage, but had to pull out of the race before the seventh and final stage due to stomach problems. He had spent the night before in the hospital with an abdominal sub-obstruction, an injury dating back to his childhood when he was kicked in the stomach by a horse. Being physically unable to complete the race cost him his podium position and the team 70 UCI World Tour points. Horner was the squad's best finisher, fourth overall. Rosseler won the closing time trial and, consequently, the overall crown of the Three Days of De Panne at the end of March. He had entered the stage as one of a great number of riders within ten seconds of pending race leader Bert De Backer. After teammate Kwiatkowski had first set a time solidly better than those which came before, Rosseler did him 14 seconds better to win both the stage and the race overall. Kwiatkowski took third in the stage and overall, while the squad earned the teams classification win.

The team entered the Tour of the Basque Country in April with defending champion Horner heading their squad, along with Klöden. Both finished near stage 1 winner Joaquim Rodríguez, with Horner a second back and Klöden tied on the same time. The race's top riders marked one another closely, and since the Tour of the Basque Country did not award bonus time anywhere in the race, these positions held through the fifth and final road race stage, with only the individual time trial remaining. Rodríguez is a vastly inferior time trialist to Horner, Klöden, and the other riders who populated the top of the overall standings going in, meaning the overall victory was very much in play. The winning time came from 's Tony Martin. Horner clocked in 55 seconds down on Martin in ninth place for the day. Klöden actually surpassed Martin's best time at the intermediate time check, but could not maintain his pace. He still finished very strongly, only nine seconds down for second on the day. True to reputation, Rodríguez struggled, ceding two minutes to the stage winner. He also won the points classification. Klöden turned in another fine race against the clock at the Giro del Trentino. He won the  time trial by a single second over 's Adriano Malori and eight over teammate Machado. He cracked on the climb to Ledro Bezzecca in stage 2, however, losing six minutes and any chance at winning the race.

Always a race which had been a target for Johan Bruyneel-led teams, Team RadioShack sent a strong squad to the Tour of California, headed by Horner and three-time winner Leipheimer. After the first stage was canceled and the first two to be run both favored sprinters, the team showed strongly in stage 4. This stage ended with a summit finish on Sierra Road. Horner won this stage 1'15" clear of any other riders, a massive time gap in a race which has historically been decided by seconds. The 2011 Tour returned to Solvang for its individual time trial after the race against the clock in 2010 had been in Los Angeles. Leipheimer, three times a winner on this course, could only manage second 14 seconds the lesser of 's David Zabriskie. Horner was sixth, 51 seconds down, but still held a lead of 38 seconds over Leipheimer and over a minute against the next highest rider. The two captains dominated stage 7 to Mount Baldy. Horner allowed Leipheimer to cross the line first – though Leipheimer had won the overall at the Tour of California three times, and similarly the Solvang time trial, this was his first road race stage win at the event. The two finished safely in the peloton in the finale stage, ending the race as the first two of five Americans at the top of the overall standings.

The team also won lesser classifications at the Volta ao Algarve, Volta a Catalunya, the Eneco Tour, the Tour of Utah, the Tour du Poitou-Charentes, the Tour de Wallonie-Picarde, and the Tour of Beijing. The team also sent squads to the Tour Down Under, the Giro di Sardegna, Tirreno–Adriatico, the Tour de Romandie, the Tour de Luxembourg, the Critérium du Dauphiné and the Tour de Pologne, but did not achieve a stage win, classification win, or podium finish in any of them.

Grand Tours

Giro d'Italia

Tour de France

Vuelta a España

Away from competition

Merger with Leopard Trek

Riders' 2012 teams

Season victories

Footnotes

References

2011 road cycling season by team